This is a list of the Nepal national football team results from the oldest known record to the present day only

* Nepal score always listed first

2020–
Results accurate up to 11 June 2022.

2015–2019
Results are accurate to 19 November 2019.

2010–2014
Result are accurate to 31 October 2014

* Nepal score always listed first

2005–2009

2000–2004

1985–1999

1972–1984

Record

By competition
*Denotes draws include knockout matches decided on penalty kicks.
**Red border color indicates tournament was held on home soil.

FIFA World Cup

AFC Asian Cup

AFC Challenge Cup

AFC Solidarity Cup

SAFF Championship

Olympic Games

{| Class = "wikitable" style = "text-align: center; width:50%;"
|-
! style="background:#ED1C24;border: 2px solid #3F43A4;"|Host/Year
! style="background:#ED1C24;border: 2px solid #3F43A4;"|Result
! style="background:#ED1C24;border: 2px solid #3F43A4;"|Q
! style="background:#ED1C24;border: 2px solid #3F43A4;"|
! style="background:#ED1C24;border: 2px solid #3F43A4;"|W
! style="background:#ED1C24;border: 2px solid #3F43A4;"|D*
! style="background:#ED1C24;border: 2px solid #3F43A4;"|L
! style="background:#ED1C24;border: 2px solid #3F43A4;"|GF
! style="background:#ED1C24;border: 2px solid #3F43A4;"|GA
! style="background:#ED1C24;border: 2px solid #3F43A4;"|GD
! style="background:#ED1C24;border: 2px solid #3F43A4;"|Points
|-
| 1896||colspan="10"|No football tournament was held
|-
| 1900||colspan="10" rowspan="7"|Non-IOC Member
|-
| 1904
|-
| 1908
|-
| 1912
|-
| 1920
|-
| 1924
|-
| 1928
|-
| 1932||colspan="10"|No football tournament was held
|-
| 1936||colspan="10" rowspan="5"|Non-IOC Member
|-
| 1948
|-
| 1952
|-
| 1956
|-
| 1960
|-
| 1964||colspan="10" rowspan="9"|did not enter
|-
| 1968
|-
| 1972
|-
| 1976
|-
| 1980
|-
| 1984
|-
| 1988
|-
| 1992
|-
| 1996
|-
|colspan=11| Age bar restriction after 1996, U23s only.
|-
| 2000||colspan=10 rowspan=5|did not enter
|-
|2004
|-
| 2008
|-
|2012
|-
| 2016
|-
| 2020||TBD||-||-||-||-||-||-||-||-||-
|-
!Total ||-||0/25||0||0||0||0||0||0||0||0
|-
|}

Asian Games

South Asian Games

Other tournaments
In these tournaments, Nepal was sometimes fielded as 'ANFA XI', 'Nepal XI', or 'Nepal Sports Development Authority' despite being the de facto national football team endorsed by the ANFA.**Former rules, win = 2pts.By manager

All time team record

International match recordsUpdated 11 June 2021 after match against ''

See also 
 Nepal women's national football team results

Notes

References

External links
RSSSF Record

Results